The 1973 Cal State Fullerton Titans football team represented California State University, Fullerton as a member of the California Collegiate Athletic Association (CCAA) during the 1973 NCAA Division II football season. Led by second-year head coach Pete Yoder, Cal State Fullerton compiled an overall record of 7–4 with a mark of 1–3 in conference play, placing in a three-way tie for third in the CCAA. The Titans played home games at Santa Ana Stadium in Santa Ana, California.

Schedule

References

Cal State Fullerton
Cal State Fullerton Titans football seasons
Cal State Fullerton Titans football